Mahmut Akan (born 14 July 1994) is a Turkish professional footballer who plays as a left-back for Süper Lig club Ankaragücü.

Professional career
Mahmut made his professional debut for Karabükspor in a 3–2 Süper Lig victory over Akhisar Belediyespor on 2 June 2017.

References

External links
 
 
 Mahmut Akan at Soccerway

Living people
1994 births
Turkish footballers
Association football defenders
Süper Lig players
TFF First League players
People from Keçiören
Ankaraspor footballers
MKE Ankaragücü footballers
Kardemir Karabükspor footballers
Menemenspor footballers